Connor Idun (born 29 July 2000) is an Australian rules footballer who plays for the Greater Western Sydney Giants in the Australian Football League (AFL).

Early life
Connor Idun was born in London to an African father and Australian mother and was raised in Essex to the age of 4. 

As a child he moved with his family from London to Sydney before relocating to Victoria. 

He began playing Australian rules football at the age of 12 in Geelong for Drysdale Football Club juniors and completed his VCE at Christian College. He played two seasons of NAB League for the Geelong Falcons primarily in defence before being selected to represent Victoria Country at the 2018 NAB AFL U18 Championships.

AFL career
Idun was selected by the Greater Western Sydney Giants at pick No. 61 in the 2018 AFL national draft. He made his senior debut against Sydney in round 20 of the 2019 season, as a late replacement for injured forward Jeremy Cameron. He only managed three games across his first two years before being selected in round one, 2021 and going on to play 21 out of a possible 22 games, averaging 5.4 marks and 12.6 disposals per game. He was named the NAB AFL Rising Star nomination for round 23 of the 2021 season.

References

External links

Connor Idun from AFL Tables

2000 births
Living people
Australian rules footballers from Victoria (Australia)
Greater Western Sydney Giants players
Geelong Falcons players
VFL/AFL players born outside Australia